Birdnesters of Thailand is a 1991 French short documentary film directed by Éric Valli. It was nominated for an Academy Award for Best Documentary Short.

References

External links

1991 short films
1991 films
1991 documentary films
1990s French-language films
French short documentary films
1990s short documentary films
French independent films
Films directed by Éric Valli
1991 independent films
1990s French films